SSTP may refer to:

Technology
 Screened shielded twisted pair, a type of wiring
 Secure Socket Tunneling Protocol, a form of virtual private network (VPN) tunnel
 Simple Symmetric Transport Protocol, a protocol for delivering messages between clients and servers
 Simple Studio Profile (SStP), of the MPEG-4 Part 2 video compression format

Other uses
 Shanghai Scientific and Technical Publishers
 Suomen Sosialistinen Työväenpuolue, Socialist Workers Party of Finland
 Streamlined Sales Tax Project